Basketball tournaments have been staged at the Universiade since 1959. The men's tournament was introduced at the 1959 Summer Universiade and the women's tournament was introduced at the 1961 Summer Universiade. The tournament was not held during the 1975 event.

Medal winners

Men

Women

Combinated Medal table 
Last updated after the 2019 Summer Universiade

External links 
Sports123 (Men)
Sports123 (Women)
Todor 66

 
Sports at the Summer Universiade
Universiade